"Ready, Willing and Able" is a song written by Jess Leary and Jody Alan Sweet. It was first recorded in 1994 by Daron Norwood for his 1995 Giant Records album of the same name.

It was later recorded by Lari White.  Released in December 1995, White's version was the first single from the album Don't Fence Me In.  The song reached number 20 on the Billboard Hot Country Singles & Tracks chart.

Chart performance

References

1996 singles
1995 songs
Lari White songs
Song recordings produced by Josh Leo
RCA Records Nashville singles
Daron Norwood songs